Beryllophantis poicila is a species of moth of the family Tortricidae. It is found in Papua New Guinea. The habitat consists of montane rain forests with Nothofagus.

The wingspan is about 13 mm. The ground colour of the forewings is deep pale emerald green above an oblique line, with grey-black marks along the costa, the fold and in the apex. The dorsal half of the wing is beige with ochrous and pale ferrugineous scales. The hindwings are pale greyish beige, the apical third darker greyish, with some dark grey transverse strigulae.

References

Moths described in 1979
Tortricini
Moths of Papua New Guinea
Taxa named by Marianne Horak